Brendan Francis Boyle (born February 6, 1977) is an American politician serving as a Democratic member of the United States House of Representatives, representing a district in the Philadelphia area since 2015. Since January 2023, he has served as Ranking Member of United States House Committee on the Budget. He represented the 13th district from 2015 to 2019, serving much of northeast Philadelphia and most of suburban Montgomery County. Since 2019, he has represented the 2nd district, which includes the northeastern fourth of Philadelphia. Boyle represented the 170th district in the Pennsylvania House of Representatives from 2009 to 2015.

Early life and education

Boyle is the elder of two sons. His father, Francis (Frank), is an Irish immigrant who came to the United States in 1970 from Glencolmcille, a district in the south-west of County Donegal in Ulster, Ireland, and works as a janitor for the Southeastern Pennsylvania Transportation Authority (SEPTA). His late mother, Eileen, was the child of Irish immigrants from County Sligo; she worked as a Philadelphia School District crossing guard for over 20 years.

Boyle was born and raised in Philadelphia's Olney neighborhood. He attended Cardinal Dougherty High School before receiving an academic scholarship to the University of Notre Dame, where he earned a Bachelor of Arts degree in 1999, completing the Hesburgh Program in Public Service. After working for several years as a consultant with the United States Department of Defense, including Naval Sea Systems Command, he attended graduate school at Harvard Kennedy School, where he earned a Master of Public Policy.

Pennsylvania House of Representatives

Elections
In 2008, Boyle defeated Republican Matthew Taubenberger, son of 2007 mayoral candidate Al Taubenberger, by a margin of 15,442 (59.2%) to 10,632 (40.8%), to win the election to succeed George T. Kenney, becoming the first Democrat ever elected to represent the 170th district.

In 2010, Boyle was reelected, defeating Republican Marc Collazzo, 64% to 36%.

In 2012, Boyle ran unopposed and was selected as chair of the Pennsylvania House Democratic Campaign Committee, the campaign arm of the Pennsylvania House Democratic Caucus.

Boyle ran unopposed again in 2014 resigned his seat on January 2, 2015, before being sworn in as a member of the United States House of Representatives. He was succeeded by Martina White.

Tenure
As a state lawmaker, Boyle's focus was on greater educational access, healthcare and greater economic equality.

As the first member of his family to attend college, he prioritized greater access to higher education. During his first term in office, he introduced the REACH Scholarship program, which would offer tuition-free public college for qualifying Pennsylvania students. He fought cuts to public K-12 and higher education funding, and supported greater investment in infrastructure, voting in 2013 for legislation (passed into law as Act 89) that provided the first comprehensive transportation funding overhaul in Pennsylvania in nearly 20 years, providing several billion dollars in new funds for roads, bridges and mass transit. He also founded the Eastern Montgomery County-Northeast Philadelphia Legislative Alliance, a group of local and state lawmakers who work across Northeast Philadelphia and Montgomery County on issues affecting both regions.

Boyle was a founding member of the LGBT Equality Caucus during his first term in office, voting in favor of legislation in 2009 prohibiting discrimination of LGBT Pennsylvanians in work, housing and other areas the only time it passed out of committee. In 2014, he introduced legislation to amend Pennsylvania's hate crimes statutes to include crimes perpetrated based on sexual orientation.

Boyle also introduced legislation in 2011 to make genocide education a required part of Pennsylvania public school curricula, legislation that was eventually passed into law in 2014. In 2013, he introduced legislation to expand access to school counseling services, which resulted in him being selected as recipient of the 2013 Pennsylvania School Counselor Association's "Legislator of the Year" award. In 2014, he introduced the SAFER PA Act, which required timely testing of DNA evidence kits and that backlogged and untested evidence be reported to the state. It would also require that authorities notify victims or surviving family when DNA testing is completed. The SAFER PA Act was reintroduced and signed into law by Governor Tom Wolf in 2015.

Committee assignments
Appropriations
Insurance
Labor Relations
Liquor Control
Policy

U.S. House of Representatives

Elections

2014 

In April 2013, Boyle announced his candidacy for Pennsylvania's 13th congressional district, which stretched from Montgomery County to northeast Philadelphia. The incumbent, Allyson Schwartz, gave up the seat to run for governor. Boyle had the support of nearly 30 labor unions across the Philadelphia region.

Boyle ran against former Congresswoman Marjorie Margolies, then state Senator Daylin Leach and current Montgomery County Commissioner Valerie Arkoosh for the Democratic nomination. Despite Margolies entering the race with a 32-point lead over Boyle in early polling, and having the endorsement of former President Bill Clinton, as well as support from former Pennsylvania Governor Ed Rendell and Congressman and Philadelphia Democratic Chair Bob Brady, Boyle won the primary with 41% of the vote to Margolies's 27%.

Boyle won the general election on November 4, 2014, defeating Republican nominee Carson "Dee" Adcock with 67% of the vote.

2016 

No Republican or other party candidate filed to run against Boyle in 2016, so he was reelected unopposed.

2018 

The Supreme Court of Pennsylvania imposed a new map for Pennsylvania's congressional districts in February 2018. Boyle then announced that he would run for reelection in the new 2nd district. This district had previously been the 1st district, represented by retiring fellow Democrat Bob Brady. But the new 2nd absorbed all of the Philadelphia portion of the old 13th, including Boyle's home. PoliticsPA rated Boyle's district as not vulnerable (a safe seat).

2020 

In 2020, Boyle won a fourth term, defeating Republican nominee David Torres.

2022

Tenure
As a member of Congress, Boyle has prioritized legislative measures to address national income inequality, while expanding access to healthcare and education. He has supported legislation to raise the federal hourly minimum wage to $12 and measures to revise the way Social Security benefits are calculated to keep them from being reduced over time.

Boyle has been outspoken about the need to protect American jobs. After Mondelez International announced that it would close a Philadelphia factory, Boyle announced his support for the Oreo Boycott by appearing with a poster featuring an Oreo cookie red circle and line through it, accompanied by the message, "Say no to Oreo". After highlighting the American layoffs, he noted that Mondelez's CEO had received a pay increase.

Along with Representative Marc Veasey, Boyle is co-founder and chair of the Blue Collar Caucus, which aims to promote discussion and develop legislation to help "addressing wage stagnation, job insecurity, trade, offshoring, and dwindling career opportunities for those in the manufacturing and building trades".

Boyle filed the Standardizing Testing and Accountability Before Large Elections Giving Electors Necessary Information for Unobstructed Selection Act (Stable Genius Act) in 2018. The measure would compel "nominees of each political party to file a report with the Federal Election Commission certifying that he or she underwent a medical exam by the Secretary of the Navy" containing the exam's results.

Boyle is also the sponsor of H.R. 6094: To prohibit lifting of United States sanctions imposed with respect to North Korea.

Boyle joined other members of Congress to urge House leaders to get federal money to Philadelphia's ailing schools.

Boyle was one of the first members of Congress to endorse Joe Biden for president in 2020, doing so the day Biden declared his candidacy.

Boyle was selected as one of 17 speakers to jointly deliver the keynote address at the 2020 Democratic National Convention.

In 2021, Boyle introduced in the Congress a draft of a non-binding resolution H.Res. 741 with an official title: "Expressing support for the designation of the month of September 2022 as "Macedonian American Heritage Month" and celebrating the Macedonian language, history, and culture of Macedonian Americans and their incredible contributions to the United States." The resolution claims ahistorically that the first "Macedonian immigrants" reached the territory of today's United States in 1492. That caused a critical reaction from the Macedonian Patriotic Organization, which has a report to Congress on who Macedonian Bulgarians are, insisting the first Macedonian Slavic immigrants moved to the U.S. in the late 19th and early 20th centuries, while identifying themselves as Bulgarians, at least until the middle of the 20th century. The draft failed.

Ratings 
Boyle has received the following ratings from advocacy organizations:

 Human Rights Campaign: 100%
 League of Conservation Voters: 100%
 Planned Parenthood Action Fund: 100%
 American Civil Liberties Union: 88%
 The National Organization for the Reform of Marijuana Laws: B
 United States Chamber of Commerce: 58%
 FreedomWorks: 5%

Committee assignments
Committee on Ways and Means
Budget Committee (Ranking Member)

Caucus memberships
Congressional Asian Pacific American Caucus
Climate Solutions Caucus
Congressional Progressive Caucus
New Democrat Coalition
Medicare for All Caucus
Blue Collar Caucus (Chair)

Personal life
Boyle is married to Jennifer, a Montgomery County public school teacher; they couple have one child and reside in Philadelphia's Somerton neighborhood.

Boyle's brother Kevin serves as a representative of Pennsylvania's 172nd House district, having been elected in 2010 by defeating former Speaker of the House John M. Perzel. The Boyles were the first brothers to serve simultaneously in the Pennsylvania House.

Awards and honors 
In August 2008, Boyle was named "one of top 10 rising stars" in politics by the Philadelphia Daily News.

In 2011, the Aspen Institute chose Boyle as one of its Rodel Fellows, a program that "seeks to enhance our democracy by identifying and bringing together the nation's most promising young political leaders."

References

External links

 Congressman Brendan Boyle official U.S. House website
 Brendan Boyle for Congress
 

 

|-

|-

|-

|-

1977 births
21st-century American politicians
American people of Irish descent
Harvard Kennedy School alumni
Living people
Democratic Party members of the United States House of Representatives from Pennsylvania
Democratic Party members of the Pennsylvania House of Representatives
Politicians from Philadelphia
University of Notre Dame alumni